Minuscule 193 (in the Gregory-Aland numbering), ε 225 (Soden), is a Greek minuscule manuscript of the New Testament, on parchment. Palaeographically it has been assigned to the 12th or 13th century. It has complex contents and full marginalia.

Description 

The codex contains a complete text of the four Gospels, written on parchment leaves (size ), in one column per page, in 27 lines per page, in black or dark-brown ink, the capital letters in gold.

There is also a division according to the smaller Ammonian Sections (in Mark 240 Sections – the last numbered section in 16:20), (no references to the Eusebian Canons).

It contains the Epistula ad Carpianum, Eusebian Canon tables at the beginning, and pictures (before Gospel of John, portrait of John the Evangelist with Prochorus).

Text 

The Greek text of the codex is a representative of the Byzantine text-type. Hermann von Soden classified it to the textual family Kx. Aland placed it in Category V.

According to the Claremont Profile Method it represents textual family Kx in Luke 1 and Luke 20. In Luke 10 no profile was made.

History 

The manuscript was examined by Birch, Scholz, and Burgon. C. R. Gregory saw it in 1886.

It is currently housed at the Laurentian Library (Plutei. VI. 32), at Florence.

See also 
 List of New Testament minuscules
 Biblical manuscript
 Textual criticism

References

Further reading 

 

Greek New Testament minuscules
13th-century biblical manuscripts